This list comprises all players who have participated in at least one league match for New York City FC since the team's first Major League Soccer season in 2015. Players who were on the roster but never played a first team game are not listed; players who appeared for the team in other competitions (US Open Cup, CONCACAF Champions League, etc.) but never actually made an MLS appearance are noted at the bottom of the page.

A "†" denotes players who only appeared in a single match.

A
 Saad Abdul-Salaam
 R. J. Allen
 Pablo Álvarez
 Eloi Amagat
 Angeliño

B
 Mehdi Ballouchy
 Dan Bedoya †
 Jo Inge Berget
 Connor Brandt †
 Federico Bravo
 Frédéric Brillant
 Jeb Brovsky

C
 Javier Calle
 Alexander Callens
 Miguel Camargo
 Valentin Castellanos
 Maxime Chanot

D
 Mix Diskerud
 Matt Dunn †

F
 Shay Facey

G
 Ned Grabavoy

H
 Justin Haak
 Jack Harrison
 Heber
 Jason Hernandez
 Yangel Herrera
 Cedric Hountondji †

I
 Sebastien Ibeagha
 Andoni Iraola

J
 Andrew Jacobson
 Eirik Johansen †

L
 Frank Lampard
 Jonathan Lewis (soccer)
 Mikey Lopez

M
 Gary Mackay-Steven
 Diego Martínez
 Rónald Matarrita
 Thomas McNamara
 Ryan Meara †
 Jesus Medina
 Jefferson Mena
 Stiven Mendoza
 Eric Miller (soccer)
 Alexandru Mitrita
 Maximiliano Moralez
 Patrick Mullins

N
 Adam Nemec

O
 Ebenezer Ofori
 Sean Okoli

P
 Keaton Parks
 Andrea Pirlo
 Kwadwo Poku

R
 Alexander Ring
 Tony Rocha

S
 James Sands
 Josh Saunders
 Khiry Shelton
 John Stertzer
 Andraz Struna
 Ben Sweat

T
 Ismael Tajouri-Shradi
 Tony Taylor
 Anton Tinnerholm
 Guđmundur Thórarinsson
 Juan Pablo Torres (soccer) †

V
 Sebastián Velásquez
 David Villa

W
 Rodney Wallace (soccer)
 Kwame Watson-Siriboe
 Ethan White
 Josh Williams
 Chris Wingert

Z
 Gedion Zelalem

Miscellaneous
 Shannon Gomez made no first team appearances for the club. NYCFC declined his option following the 2017 season. He appeared in one U.S. Open Cup match.

Sources
MLSSoccer.com | NYCFC | Rosters 2015-2020 
New York City FC Players :Category:New York City FC players

New York City FC
 
Association football player non-biographical articles
New York City FC players